Mary Allen West (July 13, 1837 – December 1, 1892) was an American journalist, editor, educator, philanthropist, superintendent of schools, and temperance worker. A teacher in her early career, she served as superintendent of schools in Knox County, Illinois, being one of the first women to fill such a position in Illinois. An active supporter of the temperance movement, West served as president of the Illinois Woman's Christian Temperance Union (WCTU), and editor of the national paper, Union Signal. Her other roles within the WCTU included superintendent of the Training School for Temperance Workers, Illinois State Superintendent of Temperance in Schools of Higher Education, as well as Stockholder, Director, and Secretary of the Woman's Publication Association. She was the first president of the Illinois Woman's Press Association, member of the Chicago Woman's Club, director of the Protective Agency for Women and Children. West was the author of Childhood: Its Care and Culture (1892). She died in Japan, in 1892, while training temperance workers in organization and promotion reform efforts.

Early life and education
Mary Allen West was born in Galesburg, Illinois, July 13, 1837; she was the first child born in this city. Her parents were among the founders of Knox College, one of the earliest collegiate institutions in the Mississippi Valley. The parents hailed from New York and founded Galesburg, with George Washington Gale, Sylvanus Ferris, and Thomas Simmons.

West was a healthy, vigorous, studious child who matured early, both mentally and physically. She passed the examinations that qualified her to enter Knox Female Seminary at age 13, then taught for two years until she was old enough to enter. She then graduated at 17.

Career

Educator
Immediately after graduation, she began to teach school, which she then believed to be her life work. Successful in teaching and influential in educational circles, West earned a reputation as a "lady of grit, grace, and gumption." Despite refusing to run for the position, she was elected to the office of superintendent of schools in Knox County, Illinois in 1873. This made her one of the first women to fill such a position in Illinois. She served in that capacity for nine years and resigned on accepting the presidency of the Illinois WCTU.

She attended many educational conventions and was a power in them, and continually wrote for school and other journals. She thus showed herself to have the capacity for almost unlimited hard work. Home duties were at that time pressing heavily, including as they did the care and nursing of an invalid mother and sister. She occupied a prominent social position, and her work included Sunday-school teaching.

Journalist and editor
When the American Civil War broke out, she worked earnestly in organizing women into aid societies to assist the Sanitary Commission. Later, she left writing for active work in the temperance movement throughout the State. When the woman's crusade sounded the call of woman, and after the organization of the WCTU, she became an earnest worker in the cause. She assisted in organizing the women of Illinois, and in a short time, became their State president. In that office, she traveled very extensively throughout Illinois and became familiar with the homes of the people.

She wrote scores of leaflets and pamphlets, all strong and terse, including "Our Toiling Children" with Florence Kelley. Other leaflets included "Organization", "Gospel Meetings, Band of Hope, Temperance Literature:, "Scientific Temperance Literature", and "Temperance in Public Schools".

While she was State president of the WCTU, she was often called upon to "help out" in the editorial labors of Mary Bannister Willard, the editor of the Union Signal, published in Chicago. Later, it was merged with Our Union, becoming the Union Signal, under the editorship of Willard. During this time, she also served as the superintendent of the Training School for Temperance Workers, Illinois State Superintendent of Temperance in Schools of Higher Education, as well as Stockholder, Director, and Secretary of the Woman's Publication Association.

Before Willard went to Germany to reside, West removed to Chicago, and accepted the position of editor-in-chief, with Mrs. Elizabeth Wheeler Andrew as her assistant. As editor of that paper, the organ of the national and the world's Woman's Christian Temperance Union, her responsibilities were immense, but they were carried well. She met the demands of her enormous constituency in a remarkable degree. A paper having a circulation of nearly 100,000 women, needed judicious and strong, as well as thorough and comprehensive, editing. This the Union Signal had, and the women of the WCTU repeatedly, in the most emphatic manner, endorsed West's policy and conduct of the paper.

Childhood: Its Care and Culture

While serving as Illinois state president of the WCTU, and traveling throughout the state, the knowledge she gained of the inner life of thousands of homes, together with her intimate studies of children in the schoolroom, efficiently supplemented her natural bias for the task of writing her book for mothers, Childhood, its Care and Culture. It was published by the Woman's Temperance Association of Chicago in 1892. In it, the author claimed that the book "has grown naturally out of the rich soil of a thousand homes," which was interpreted to mean that the author wrote from experience and observation and not from mere theory.

The contents were varied, including chapters on the child's body, babyhood, childhood, boyhood and girlhood, children's rights, work and play, amusements, behavior, domestic economy, family government, practical health hints, and other topics. There were also a number of illustrations, and, interspersed among the reading matter, were songs set to music, suitable for the nursery and the home. The book was an octavo of 722 pages, including a copious index. It was pervaded by strong Christian and temperance sentiment, the author holding that the growth in a child of a true and healthy religious and physical life was greatly to be desired and sought after, not only for its own sake, but for the general well being of society. On the various practical questions coming under treatment, the views set forth were characterized as sound and sensible.

The variety and range of topics almost invited the remark that some at least must suffer from superficial or hackneyed treatment, but the author appeared to have labored conscientiously and carefully over each section, and to have brought together many wise thoughts and counsels for the benefit of those who really desire guidance and help in the care and nurture of children.

Illinois Woman's Press Association
Soon after she went to Chicago to reside, some Chicago women, both writers and publishers, organized the Illinois Woman's Press Association. Its avowed purpose was to provide a means of communication between woman writers, and to secure the benefits resulting from organized effort West was made president, and is now filling the position for the fifth consecutive annual term. Her work in that sphere has been a unifying one. She has brought into harmony many conflicting elements, and has helped to carry the association through the perils which always beset the early years of an organization. She has been a wise and practical leader, inaugurating effective branches of work, which have been of great value to the association.

Personal life
She was a member of the Chicago Woman's Club, and an effective director of the Protective Agency for Women and Children, but the strain of that work proved too great, and she has stepped outside its directorship, although remaining an ardent upholder of the agency. Her heart was in her Galesburg home, the home of her childhood and youth, and when she allowed herself a holiday, it was to spend a few days there. West, in 1892, visited California, the Sandwich Islands, and Japan in the interests of temperance work,
 arriving in Yokohama in September. She died in Japan before the end of the year, and is buried in Hope Cemetery, Galesburg.

Selected works
Childhood: its care and culture (1892)

References

Attribution

Bibliography

External links
 

1837 births
1892 deaths
19th-century American women writers
19th-century American newspaper editors
19th-century American women educators
19th-century American educators
People from Galesburg, Illinois
American women journalists
Woman's Christian Temperance Union people
United States Sanitary Commission people
School superintendents in Illinois
Women newspaper editors
Editors of Illinois newspapers
Wikipedia articles incorporating text from A Woman of the Century
American magazine editors
Women magazine editors